Restaurant Makeover is a television series on HGTV Canada that currently airs as reruns on the Food Network Canada and HGTV Canada, as well as the Fine Living channel and Food Network in the United States, DTour and in over 16 other countries worldwide.  The pilot episode starred designer Robin De Groot and chef Brad Long in the Coco's Cafe. Most of the restaurants involved in the series were located in the Greater Toronto Area. The series has been rebooted as Restaurant Takeover on Food Network Canada.

Synopsis

It is hosted by chefs Brad Long, Rene Chauvin, Lynn Crawford, Massimo Capra, Corbin Tomaszeski, David Adjey, and Susur Lee along with designers Robin De Groot, Meredith Heron, Cherie Nicole Stinson, Jessica Cotton, Glen Peloso, Brenda Bent, Cheryl Torrenueva, Lisa North, and Jonathan Furlong, who perform renovation makeovers on restaurants desiring transformation.

The premise of the show is to challenge two restaurant professionals, one designer and one chef, to overhaul a struggling restaurant with a very limited budget and time.  Originally the show would match funds provided by the restaurant owners up to $20,000; however, that decreased to just $15,000 as the show moved into its later seasons.

Criticism

Although the show's premise is to help struggling restaurants, a number of establishments have failed shortly after their makeover — sometimes before the episode of the show featuring the restaurant had aired, thus not allowing them to reap the benefits of added exposure. Some critics held the opinion that participating in Restaurant Makeover was a "kiss of death" for failing restaurants. However, it was noted that given the dire condition of some participants' establishments, even a significant change could not salvage the business.

List of renovated restaurants

Season 1

Season 2

Season 3

Season 4

Season 5

References

External links
 Episode list from Food Network Canada
 Episode list from HGTV
 

Food reality television series
Food Network (Canadian TV channel) original programming
HGTV (Canada) original programming
2005 Canadian television series debuts
2008 Canadian television series endings
2000s Canadian reality television series
Television series by Alliance Atlantis